Greg Colby (born February 25, 1952) is an American football coach.  He was the defensive coordinator at Central Michigan University from 2015 to 2018.  Colby served as the head football coach at Millersville University of Pennsylvania from 2008 to 2012, compiling a record of 11–44.  He was the defensive coordinator at Kent State University from 1998 to 2001 and at Northwestern University from 2002 to 2007.

Head coaching record

College

References

1952 births
Living people
American football linebackers
Central Michigan Chippewas football coaches
Illinois Fighting Illini baseball coaches
Illinois Fighting Illini baseball players
Illinois Fighting Illini football coaches
Illinois Fighting Illini football players
Kent State Golden Flashes football coaches
Michigan State Spartans football coaches
Millersville Marauders football coaches
Northwestern Wildcats football coaches
High school baseball coaches in the United States
High school football coaches in Illinois
People from Danville, Illinois
Players of American football from Illinois
Baseball players from Illinois